Old Massett Village Council is a band government of the Haida people, located in Old Massett, on Haida Gwaii. Old Massett Village Council is one of two Canadian band governments for the Haida Nation, the other is the Skidegate Band Council.  The main governing body of the Haida people is the Council of the Haida Nation.

Indian Reserves
Indian Reserves under the administration of Old Massett Village Council are:

Ain 6, N shore of Masset Inlet, Graham Island, 66.40 ha.
Cohoe Point 20, Dibbell Bay, E. of Langara Island, 10.10 ha.
Daningay 12, west side of Virago Sound, Graham Island, 8.50 ha.
Egeria Bay 19, Egeria Bay, Langara Island, 10.10 ha.
Guoyskun 22, Rhodeas Point, Langara island, 20.20 ha.
Hiellen 2, mouth of Hiellen River, south of Tow Hill Provincial Park, McIntyre Bay, Graham Island, 27.40 ha. (site of Hiellen)
Jalun 14, northwest of Nankivell Point, mouth of Jalun River, north coast of Graham Island, 7.10 ha.
Kioosta 15, south shore of Parry Passage, northwest tip of Graham Island 40.90 ha., site of Kiusta
Kose 9, left bank of the Naden River, four miles south of the mouth of Naden Harbour, Graham Island, 3.60 ha.
Kung 11, west side of Alexandra Narrows, which connects Naden Harbour and Virago Sound, 28.70 ha.
Lanas 4, at the mouth of the Yakoun River, Yakoun Bay, southeast short of Masset Inlet, 78 ha.
Mammin River 25, mouth of the Mamin River on Mammin Bay, Masset Inlet, Graham Island, 2.50 ha.
Masset 1, east shore of Masset Harbour below its entry point, north coast of Graham Island (Old Massett), 299.50
Meagwan 8, at Wiah Point, north coast of Graham Island east of Virago Sound, 19.80 ha.
Naden 10, west shore at mouth of Naden River, Naden Harbour, Graham Island, 10.90 ha.
Naden 22, at mouth of Standly Creek, Naden Harbour, Graham Island 2.60 ha.
Owun 24, at the mouth of Awun River on Awun Bay, south shore of Masset Inlet, Graham Island 3 ha.
Saouchten 18, Rooney Point, west side of Masset Harbour, Graham Island 11.40 ha.
Satunquin 5, at Strathdang Kwun, point on west side of Yakoun Bay, Masset Inlet, Graham Island, 3.60 ha.
Susk 17, Peril Bay, east of Frederick Island, west shore of Graham Island, 63.10 ha.
Tatense 16, southwest tip of Langara Island, south of Parry Passage, northwest of Graham Island 6.50 ha.
Tiahn 27, Tiany Bay, north shore of Graham Island, 2.30 ha.
Tlaa Gaa Aawtlaas 28, 63.70 ha.
Yagan 3, at Yakan Point, west of Tow Hill Provincial Park, on McIntyre Bay, south of Graham Island, 34.80 ha. (site of Yagan)
Yan 7, west side of entrance to Masset Harbour, Graham Island, 106.80 ha. (site of Yan.
Yasitkun 21, northwest coast of Langara Island, northwest of Graham Island, 20.20 ha.
Yatze 13, southeast of Klashwun Point, west of Virago Sound, north coast of Graham Island, 18.20 ha.

References
Old Massett Village Council, First Nation Profile, Indigenous and Northern Affairs Canada
Old Massett Village Council, A-Z First Nations Listing, Government of British Columbia
Old Massett Village Council

Haida governments
Haida Gwaii
First Nations tribal councils in British Columbia
First Nations governments in British Columbia